Ganesh Parbat is a mountain of the Garhwal Himalaya in Uttarakhand India.The elevation of Ganesh Parbat is  and its prominence is . It is 80th joint highest located entirely within the Uttarakhand. Nanda Devi, is the highest mountain in this category. It is situated in the Zaskar Range. It lies 13.3 km ENE of Kamet . Its nearest higher neighbor an unnamed peak  lies 8 km ENE and it is 11 km NWN of Geldhung . It lies 14.2 km NE of Mana Peak .

Climbing history
On June 16 an Indian Police expedition team led by Shivraj Singh had the first ascent of Ganesh Parbat. The 10 men team reached the summit at 11:30 a.m. starting at 2 a.m. The leader reached the summit with Ramesh Shahi, P. Singh, Balwant Singh Pal, Ang Chatter, Sherpas Sang Boo Aila and Hisse, and Garhwalis HAP Puran and Kalyan Singh.

Neighboring and subsidiary peaks
neighboring or subsidiary peaks of Ganesh Parbat:
 Kamet: 
 Mana Peak: 
 Mana Northwest: 
 Bidhan: 
 Mandir Parbat:

Glaciers and rivers
Raikana Glacier, Uttari Raikana Glacier, Ganesh Glacier all three glacier joins Purbi Kamet Glacier from there emerges the river Dhauli Ganga which met Alaknanda river at Vishnu Prayag an 82 km journey from its mouth. Alaknanda river is one of the main tributaries of river Ganga which later joins the other tributaries Bhagirathi river at Dev Prayag.

See also

 List of Himalayan peaks of Uttarakhand

References

Mountains of Uttarakhand
Six-thousanders of the Himalayas
Geography of Chamoli district